The 2019 Lao Premier League is the 30th season of the Lao Premier League. The season starts on 23 February 2019. It is played in triple round-robin format, with 15 total rounds.

Teams 
A total of 6 teams participated in the 2019 Lao League season, not promoted from the previous season of Lao Division 1 League. 6 teams withdrew from the league.

Stadia
''Note: Table lists in alphabetical order.

Foreign players

source

League table

Results

Round 1–10

Round 11–15

References

External links
Lao Premier League website

Laos
Lao Premier League seasons
2019 in Laotian football